Bodhi Pine Elfman (born Bodhi Pine Saboff) is an American actor and the child of filmmaker Richard Elfman and Rhonda Joy Saboff. He is best known for playing the roles of Avram Hader in the Fox television series Touch and for his recurring role in the CBS television series Criminal Minds as Peter "Mr. Scratch" Lewis.

Career
Elfman has had film roles in Mercury Rising, Collateral, Godzilla and Armageddon, and smaller parts in The Mod Squad, Keeping the Faith, and Gone in 60 Seconds.

Elfman starred in the UPN television series Freedom, alongside Holt McCallany, Scarlett Chorvat and Darius McCrary, and in Pirates of Silicon Valley alongside Noah Wyle and Anthony Michael Hall. He appeared in the short-lived ABC television series Hiller and Diller, guest-starred in an episode of Sliders, and was part of the recurring cast of Touch. Elfman also guest-starred in his wife's television show Dharma & Greg, playing a performance artist who asks Dharma to be a part of his living display gallery.

In 2012, Elfman and his wife, Jenna, started their podcast, Kicking and Screaming by Jenna and Bodhi Elfman.

Personal life
Bodhi Pine Elfman was born in Los Angeles, California, and raised in the city's Hollywood district. He is the son of actor/director Richard Elfman and Rhonda Joy Saboff, grandson of author Blossom Elfman, and nephew of composer Danny Elfman. In February 1991, he met Jennifer Mary Butala (Jenna Elfman) during an audition for a Sprite commercial. Four years later, they were married on February 18, 1995. Bodhi is of Jewish descent, and Jenna was raised Catholic. When they met he was a practicing Scientologist. Jenna became a Scientologist after her husband introduced her to its teachings.

In 2000, Bodhi and Jenna Elfman bought the home owned by Madonna, a  1920s house on a gated two-acre lot in the Hollywood Hills section of Los Angeles. Having paid US$4 million, they later sold the property in April 2004 for US$4.7 million to actress Katey Sagal, of Married... with Children  fame.

Their first child, son Story, was born in 2007, and their second child, son Easton, was born in 2010.

Filmography

Film

Television

References

External links

Bodhi Elfman at tvguide.com
Bodhi Elfman at Yahoo! movies

Living people
Male actors from Los Angeles
American male film actors
American Scientologists
American people of Jewish descent
Bodhi
American podcasters
20th-century American male actors
21st-century American male actors
American male television actors
American film directors
American film producers
American male screenwriters
Screenwriters from California
1969 births